The  Dallas Cowboys season was the inaugural season for the franchise in the National Football League (NFL). 

The Cowboys finished their first season with zero wins, 11 losses, and one tie, finishing last in the Western Conference and in the NFL for that season. Due to ties not counting as a half-win/half-loss at the time, the Cowboys became the first post-World War II team in NFL history to have a .000 winning percentage, being equaled since by the 1976 Buccaneers, 2008 Lions, and 2017 Browns.

Their record was also worse than Dallas' previous entry into the NFL, the Dallas Texans, who finished 1–11 in their only season in 1952, and relocated after that season to Baltimore (being rebranded as the Colts).

Offseason
The NFL had no interest in expanding, but after Lamar Hunt started an American Football League franchise (the Dallas Texans), the NFL granted a franchise to Clint Murchison, Jr., and Bedford Wynne on January 28, 1960. As a footnote to this decision, when the NFL began considering expansion to Texas, the Washington Redskins founder and owner George Preston Marshall strongly opposed the move, as he had enjoyed a monopoly in the South for three decades (apart from the one-year appearance of the Dallas Texans in 1952). Murchison bought the rights to their fight song Hail to the Redskins from a disgruntled Barnee Breeskin (the Redskins' team band leader) and threatened to prevent Marshall from playing it at games. Marshall eventually agreed to back Murchison's bid, receiving back the rights to the song.

The franchise hired former Los Angeles Rams executive Tex Schramm as their general manager. Tom Landry, an assistant coach with the New York Giants, was named head coach. Landry was offered the coaching job before the 1959 NFL Championship Game, with a five-year contract. The same day that Landry accepted the offer, it was reported by UPI that Landry would become coach of the AFL's Houston Oilers. Gil Brandt, who had served as a part-time scout for the Rams under Schramm, was named player personnel director. The day after the title game, Landry was announced as head coach of the proposed NFL team in Texas, a franchise that had yet to be awarded.

According to Schramm, the team's name was originally the "Dallas Steers", but then was changed to the "Dallas Rangers," which was the name of the minor league baseball team that was supposed to be disbanded. The franchise was admitted to the league too late to participate in the 1960 NFL college draft. However, majority owner Murchison signed two college players, quarterback Don Meredith from SMU, and running back Don Perkins from New Mexico, to personal services contracts before the draft (and before the franchise was voted into the league). The NFL honored these contracts after the franchise was voted in, although the Baltimore Colts drafted Perkins in the ninth round, and Meredith was also selected by the Chicago Bears in the third round after owner George Halas made the pick to help ensure that the expansion Cowboys got off to a solid start. The franchise was allowed to retain both players, but had to give their third-round and ninth-round choices in the 1962 NFL draft to the Bears and Colts, respectively.

On March 13, the franchise selected 36 players in an expansion draft. Each of the other 12 NFL teams were allowed to protect 25 players from their 36-man roster. The franchise was then were given 24 hours to select three players from those unprotected by each other team.

The franchise was placed in the league's Western Conference. However, since they were the league's thirteenth franchise in addition to being an expansion franchise, it was decided that they would play every team in the league once, instead of playing each team in their conference twice, as the other teams did.

Transactions
Other notable transactions prior to the season included acquiring quarterback Eddie LeBaron from the Washington Redskins, offensive end Billy Howton from the Cleveland Browns, and signing former San Francisco 49ers fullback Gene Babb. During training camp the team signed quite a few players who were released by other teams. Notable signings included center Mike Connelly, a rookie who was released by the Los Angeles Rams, and veteran Don Bishop, a defensive back who was released by the Chicago Bears.

Name change
The franchise used the nickname "Rangers" during its draft. But on March 19, after the baseball team owners reversed course, Murchison volunteered to rename his team to the Cowboys to avoid confusion with the American Association Dallas Rangers baseball team.

Regular season

Schedule

Conference opponents are in bold text

 Saturday night (September 24), Friday night (September 30)

Season recap
Expectations certainly were not high for the Cowboys heading into their inaugural season, but they got off to a hopeful start, as the team took a 14–0 lead on Bobby Layne and the Pittsburgh Steelers early in their first game and led throughout before succumbing in the fourth quarter 35–28. The next week they played the eventual league champion Philadelphia Eagles to a near deadlock, losing 27–25, the difference being two blocked extra points.

The lack of talent on the roster caught up with them as the season went on, however. Their first ever road game was against the woeful Washington Redskins, and it ended in defeat, 26–14, spoiling quarterback Eddie LeBaron's return to the city where he starred for the Redskins during the '50s. The next week the team was annihilated at home by one of the league's top teams, the Cleveland Browns, 48–7. The team would go on to suffer more lopsided defeats, including a 45–7 loss to the defending champion Baltimore Colts, and a 41–7 loss to the eventual Western Conference champion Green Bay Packers. Squeezed in between blowout losses was rookie quarterback Don Meredith's first start, which came against the Los Angeles Rams. Predictably, Meredith struggled in a 38–13 loss.

The Cowboys also suffered heartbreaking losses, including a 12–10 defeat in St. Louis to the Cardinals, a game in which they led late only to lose on a field goal in the last minute, and a 26–14 defeat against the San Francisco 49ers, in which the Cowboys surrendered 17 points during the last 6 minutes of the game.

The lone highlight of 1960 came near the end of the season, when they traveled to Yankee Stadium and tied the New York Giants 31–31, ending the Giants' hopes of winning the Eastern Conference crown for the third year in a row. New York won the next three conference titles for five in six seasons.

The Cowboys struggled in almost every statistical category, finishing last in both points scored (177) and points allowed (369). Quarterback LeBaron and the receiving corps provided some big plays in the passing game throughout the season, but LeBaron mostly struggled behind a porous offensive line, and the quarterbacks threw a league-high 33 interceptions. Rookie halfback Perkins was lost prior to the season after breaking a bone in his foot, and the Cowboys rushing attack suffered all season long, finishing last in the league in rushing at 1049 yards, and averaging a paltry 3.4 yards per carry.

Defensively the team was gashed by opposing running games all season long, giving up 2242 yards rushing and allowing 5.0 yards per carry, both last in the league. The team's pass defense had its moments, particularly in games against the Chicago Bears and St. Louis Cardinals, but gave up too many big plays and did not provide much of a pass rush.

The kicking game proved to be average, and the kick returners were among the worst in the league, despite an ample number of opportunities (a league high 69 kick returns).

Week 1 (Saturday September 24, 1960): Pittsburgh Steelers

Standings

Roster

See also
 1960 NFL season
 1960 NFL Expansion Draft

Publications
 The Football Encyclopedia 
 Total Football 
 Cowboys Have Always Been My Heroes

References

External links
 1960 Dallas Cowboys
 Pro Football Hall of Fame
 Dallas Cowboys Official Site

Dallas Cowboys
Dallas Cowboys seasons
Dallas Cowboys
National Football League winless seasons